Clatrotitan is an extinct genus of titanopteran insect, known from the Triassic of Australia. It is originally described from a species, C. andersoni, then later study considered that Mesotitan scullyi as species of Clatrotitan too. But another study synonymized Mesotitan and Clatrotitan. A study in 2021 proposed to keep the two genera Clatrotitan and Mesotitan separated.

References

Extinct insects
Orthopterida
Insects of Australia